Brihadratha (IAST: Bṛhadratha), also known as Maharatha, was the initiator of his dynasty and also because of his greatness, his dynasty came to be known as Brihadratha dynasty, the earliest ruling dynasty of Magadha. He established Magadha on the banks of River Ganges and transferred the power from Chedi (its Neighboring kingdom) to the newly settled Magadha. In his rule and also in the rule of his famous son Jarasandha, Magadha became the Central Power of India. Magadha was the most powerful Mahajanapada of India. He had a daughter named Shashirekha who was the second wife of Dhrishtadhyumna.

Brihadratha was the eldest of the five sons of Vasu, (also known as Uparichara Vasu ) the Kuru king of Chedi and his queen Girika. His father was the ruler of Chedi and Brihadratha established Magadha at the border of Chedi Kingdom. He is Mentioned in the Epic Mahabharat and Puranas. The name of Brihadratha is also found in the Rigveda (I.36.18, X.49.6).

Name
The name is a combination of bṛhat meaning 'great' or 'huge', and ratha meaning 'chariot'. Therefore, the name Brihadratha (IAST: Bṛhadratha) can be assumed to be meaning "someone with a great/huge chariot".

Life
Brihadratha established his dynasty in Magadha. Ripunjaya was the last in his lineage, who was killed by his minister in 6th century BC.

All the Puranas mention his sister Amna, as his successor. Kushagra was succeeded by his son Vrishava (or Rishava). Pushpavanta (or Pushyavanta or Punyavanta) was the son of  Vrishava. Pushpavanta was succeeded by his son Satyahita (or Satyadhrita). Satyahita's son was Sudhanvana (or Sudharmana, Dharmatma, or Dhanusha). Dhanusha was succeeded by his son Sarva (or Urja or Jatu or Jahu or Jantu). Sarva was succeeded by his son Sambhava. According to the Agni Purana, Sambhava was succeeded by his son Jarasandha, the noted warrior king mentioned in the Mahabharata. However, all other Puranic genealogical lists mention the name of Brihadratha again between either Jantu and Jarasandha or Sambhava and Jarasandha. Jarasandha was succeeded by his son Sahadeva who was killed in the Kurukshetra war.

See also
 Pradyota dynasty
 Brihadratha dynasty

References

Citations

Sources
 

Magadha
Characters in the Mahabharata

es:Brijadratha